José Luis Álvarez can refer to:

 José Luis Álvarez (artist) (1917–2012), Guatemalan artist
 José Luis Álvarez (fencer) (born 1969), Spanish fencer
 José Luis Álvarez (rower) (born 1943), Mexican rower